Gawdyhall Big Wood, Harleston is a  biological Site of Special Scientific Interest north of Harleston in Norfolk.

This ancient wood on poorly drained chalky boulder clay has coppiced hornbeam, ash and hazel with oak standards. The ground flora is especially diverse around the hornbeams and on wet rides.

The site is private land with no public access.

References

Sites of Special Scientific Interest in Norfolk